The Ross Cup is the Canadian Senior Division I Field Lacrosse championship. The annual tournament is hosted by the Canadian Lacrosse Association and features men's teams from across Canada. Senior Division II compete for the Victory Trophy.

Champions

References

External links
Ross Cup

Lacrosse competitions in Canada
Canadian sports trophies and awards